Christiaan Snyman (born 4 May 1996) is a Namibian cricketer.

References

External links
 

1996 births
Living people
Namibian cricketers
Place of birth missing (living people)